The Upper Wade and Curtis Cabin was built in 1933 by John Grounds in Dinosaur National Monument. The rustic building served as a guest lodge and ranger station, and is listed on the National Register of Historic Places as the oldest remaining guest accommodation in the park.

References

Park buildings and structures on the National Register of Historic Places in Colorado
Buildings and structures in Moffat County, Colorado
Log cabins in the United States
Historic districts on the National Register of Historic Places in Colorado
National Register of Historic Places in Dinosaur National Monument
Houses completed in 1933
National Register of Historic Places in Moffat County, Colorado
Log buildings and structures on the National Register of Historic Places in Colorado
1933 establishments in Colorado